Rock FM is an Independent Local Radio station based in Manchester, England, owned and operated by Bauer as part of the Hits Radio network. It broadcasts to Lancashire, North West England.  

As of December 2022, the station has a weekly audience of 196,000 listeners according to RAJAR.

Overview

Originally launched in 1982 as Red Rose Radio, transmitting on 97.3 MHz and 999 kHz (301m MW). The FM frequency transmission changed when the station split to 97.4 MHz in 1990.

In 1990, Red Rose Radio was split into two stations -  Red Rose Rock FM using the FM frequency and Red Rose Gold on the medium wave frequency. Rock FM was given its name as the station was initially going to be based in Blackpool, Lancashire. However the agreement for the studio premises subsequently fell through and the station remained in Preston.

The managing director was Dave Lincoln, with Mark Matthews as programme director, and at that time the station was owned by the Miss World Group, later known as Trans World Communications (owned by Owen Oyston) and which subsequently became part of Bauer Radio (previously EMAP Radio).

The total survey area of the station for RAJAR is broadly defined as western, southern and central Lancashire including parts of Greater Manchester and Merseyside, but the station is audible on FM from Cumbria down into Wales towards The West Midlands and minor parts of North Shropshire

For over thirty years, Rock FM was based at studios in a converted church (St. Paul's) in Preston. The station consistently rates as the number one commercial radio station in its target service area by reach, share and hours. Over a quarter of all adults in its market listen every week.

In January 2020, Bauer announced Rock FM would cease broadcasting from its Preston studios and co-locate with Hits Radio at Bauer's Northern headquarters in Manchester the following month. The station retains local news, advertising and charity staff at offices elsewhere in the city.

As of February 2020, the station broadcasts from studios outside its broadcast area at Bauer's Manchester headquarters.

Programming
All of Rock FM's programming is produced and broadcast from Bauer's headquarters in the Castlefield area of Manchester.

News
Rock FM broadcasts local news bulletins hourly from 6am-7pm on weekdays, from 7am-1pm on Saturdays and Sundays. Headlines are broadcast on the half hour during weekday breakfast and drivetime shows, alongside traffic bulletins.

National bulletins from Sky News Radio are carried overnight with bespoke networked bulletins on weekend afternoons, originating from Bauer's Manchester newsroom.

References

External links
 

Bauer Radio
Hits Radio
Radio stations in Lancashire
Mass media in Preston
Radio stations established in 1982
1982 establishments in England